The Venera 11 ( meaning Venus 11) was a Soviet uncrewed space mission which was part of the Venera program to explore the planet Venus. Venera 11 was launched on 9 September 1978 at 03:25:39 UTC.

Separating from its flight platform on December 23, 1978 the lander entered the Venus atmosphere two days later on December 25 at 11.2 km/s. During the descent, it employed aerodynamic braking followed by parachute braking and ending with atmospheric braking. It made a soft landing on the surface at 06:24 Moscow Time (03:24 UT) on 25 December after a descent time of approximately 1 hour. The touchdown speed was 7 to 8 m/s. Information was transmitted to the flight platform for retransmittal to earth until it moved out of range 95 minutes after touchdown.

Flight platform
After ejection of the lander probe, the flight platform continued on past Venus in a heliocentric orbit. Near encounter with Venus occurred on December 25, 1978, at approximately 35,000 km altitude. The flight platform acted as a data relay for the descent craft for 95 minutes until it flew out of range and returned its own measurements on interplanetary space.

Venera 11 flight platform carried solar wind detectors, ionosphere electron instruments and two gamma ray burst detectors – the Soviet-built KONUS and the French-built SIGNE 2. The SIGNE 2 detectors were simultaneously flown on Venera 12 and Prognoz 7 to allow triangulation of gamma ray sources. Before and after Venus flyby, Venera 11 and Venera 12 yielded detailed time-profiles for 143 gamma-ray bursts, resulting in the first ever catalog of such events. The last gamma-ray burst reported by Venera 11 occurred on January 27, 1980.

List of flight platform instruments and experiments: 
 30–166 nm Extreme UV spectrometer
 Compound plasma spectrometer
 KONUS Gamma-ray burst detector
 SNEG Gamma-ray Burst detector
 Magnetometer 
 4 Semiconductor counters
 2 Gas-discharge counters
 4 Scintillation counters
 Hemispherical proton telescope

The mission ended in February, 1980. Venera 11 is currently in heliocentric orbit, with perihelion of 0.69 AU, aphelion of 1.01 AU, eccentricity of 0.19, inclination of 2.3 degrees and orbital period of 284 days.

Lander
The lander carried instruments to study the temperature and atmospheric and soil chemical composition. A device called Groza detected lightning on Venus. Both Venera 11 and Venera 12 had landers with two cameras, each designed for color imaging, though Soviet literature does not mention them.
Each failed to return images when the lens covers did not separate after landing due to a design flaw. The soil analyzer also failed.
A gas chromatograph was on board to measure the composition of the Venus atmosphere, as well as instruments to study scattered solar radiation. Results reported included evidence of lightning and thunder, a high Ar36/Ar40 ratio, and the discovery of carbon monoxide at low altitudes.

List of lander experiments and instruments:

 Backscatter Nephelometer
 Mass spectrometer – MKh-6411
 Gas chromatograph – Sigma
 X-Ray fluorospectrometer
 360° Scanning photometer – IOAV
 Spectrometer (430–1170 nm)
 Microphone/anemometer 
 Low-frequency radio sensor
 4 Thermometers
 3 Barometers
 Accelerometer – Bizon
 Penetrometer – PrOP-V
 Soil analysis device
 2 Color cameras
 Small solar batteries – MSB

See also

 List of missions to Venus
 Timeline of artificial satellites and space probes

References

External links
 Venera 11 & Venera 12 (NASA) - Shows Venera 13 mockup at the Cosmos Pavillion in Moscow.
 Drilling into the Surface of Venus (Venera 11 and 12) - has two images of actual descent module

Venera program
1978 in spaceflight
1978 in the Soviet Union
Derelict landers (spacecraft)
Spacecraft launched in 1978